Sean Meadows is an American musician best known as a founding member of June of 44 and The Sonora Pine for which he sang and played guitar. He also played bass guitar with Lungfish and HiM and has performed with many lesser known bands based in Chattanooga, Tennessee.

References

External links

Living people
American rock bass guitarists
American male bass guitarists
Math rock musicians
Post-hardcore musicians
Post-rock musicians
June of 44 members
Year of birth missing (living people)